It is the Zee Cine Award that is given to the best Action film of the year.

Winners 

2017 film awards
Zee Cine Awards